Barbara Kathleen Nickel (born June 22, 1966, in Saskatoon, Saskatchewan) is a Canadian poet.

Life
She was raised in Rosthern, Saskatchewan. She graduated from Goshen College and the University of British Columbia with an M.F.A.  She was the poetry editor of Prism International.

She moved to St. John's, Newfoundland and Labrador, then back in British Columbia.
She was on a panel at the 2005 Association of Writers & Writing Programs conference.

Awards
 1995 The Malahat Review Long Poem Prize
 1996 National Magazine Awards, honourable mention
 1996 Geoffrey Bilson Award for Historical Fiction for Young Adults, finalist
 1997 Mr. Christie's Book Award, finalist
 1998 B.C. Red Cedar Awards, finalist
 1998 Pat Lowther Award

Publications
"Onychomychosis", The Walrus

Young adult fiction

Anthologies

Criticism

Review
In Domain, her second collection, B.C. poet and fiction writer Barbara Nickel engages explicitly with the concept of home – specifically, the house she grew up in and the memories it evokes. That focus doesn't mean the poems are narrow in scope. Nickel subtly explores the broader associations of each room (for instance, the section "Master Bedroom" comments on marriage) and searchingly paces the halls of a family history that's filled with heartache (her Russian ancestors' village is described in idyllic terms, until "Revolution burned / that inside out").

References

1966 births
Living people
20th-century Canadian poets
21st-century Canadian poets
Canadian women poets
Goshen College alumni
University of British Columbia alumni
People from Rosthern, Saskatchewan
Writers from Saskatchewan
20th-century Canadian women writers
21st-century Canadian women writers
Canadian Mennonites
Mennonite writers
Mennonite poets